Randolph 'Randy' Coleman (born 1937) is an American composer and educator.  He was the first chairman of the national council of the American Society of University Composers, now called The Society of Composers, Inc.

Biography
Coleman was raised in Charlottesville, Virginia.  He "felt compelled to compose as a teenager" and pursued this first at the University of Virginia before completing Bachelor's, Master's and Doctoral work at Northwestern University. At Northwestern he studied with Anthony Donato (composition), 
Arrand Parsons (theory), and John Ohl (musicology).

Coleman spent the majority of his career at the Oberlin Conservatory of Music at Oberlin College, teaching composition and classes on intersections in the arts for 43 years while also teaching in guest residencies at a variety of schools and programs.

Among his students at Oberlin were Kyle Gann, Christopher Rouse, Greg Saunier, Evan Hause, Wally Scharold, Du Yun and Brenda Way.  He also worked with then students Bill Irwin and Julie Taymor as part of the InterArts program Coleman founded at Oberlin in the 1970s.

He currently lives in Oberlin with his wife, Rebecca, and their son, Schuyler. Their daughter, Emma Rose, died in 2011.

Music
Coleman's musical style is self described as trying to move on from his roots in late modernism.  He often concentrated on developing and promoting interdisciplinary works involving students from all the creative fields.

The wide range of styles and genres of his music are influenced by his own history, including performance (on piano and trombone), and conducting new music and writing prose about many types of music (traditional chamber and symphonic music, Jazz, Rhythm and Blues and a variety of non-western musics) for NOTES (MLA Journal), Fine Arts and other journals.

Awards and commissions
Coleman has had commissioned work performed by a variety of ensembles including the Brooklyn Philharmonic (1984), eighth blackbird, Cincinnati Percussion Group, and the Cleveland Contemporary Ensemble.  The Fromm Music Foundation commissioned Coleman to write a work for the first American Music Festival at Tang1ewood in 1964 (Concerto for Piano and Chamber Orchestra).

He received a Fulbright fellowship which took him to Paris and Mexico. Early in his career his work received awards from the International Society of Contemporary Music in 1962 and 1963.  In 2002 he was awarded a residency at The Rockefeller Institute of Bellagio, Italy as well as an Ohio Arts Council Individual Artist's Award.

References

External links
 Society of Composers, Inc.

1937 births
American male composers
21st-century American composers
Living people
21st-century American male musicians